Calochortus clavatus is a species of mariposa lily known by the common name clubhair mariposa lily. It is endemic to California where it is found in forests and on chaparral slopes.

Description

Atop the stem is a lily bloom with sepals up to 4 centimeters long. The petals are up to 5 centimeters long and yellow with a darker line or series of bands near the base, which are often red. The cup of the flower is filled with hairs which have clubbed ends. The anthers are often deep purple.

The capsule fruit is up to 9 centimeters long.

Varieties
Varieties of Calochortus clavatus include:
Calochortus clavatus var. avius — northwestern Sierra Nevada foothills
Calochortus clavatus var. clavatus  — 
Calochortus clavatus var. gracilis — slender Mariposa lily; western Transverse Ranges (San Gabriels, Santa Susanas, Santa Monicas, & Simi Hills.)
Calochortus clavatus var. pallidus
Calochortus clavatus var. recurvifolius — Arroyo de la Cruz mariposa lily; southern outer Coast Range north of Arroyo de la Cruz— Piedras Blancos, San Luis Obispo County.

See also
California chaparral and woodlands — ecoregion.
California coastal sage and chaparral — subregion.
California montane chaparral and woodlands — subregion.
California interior chaparral and woodlands— subregion.
List of California native plants
List of plants of the Sierra Nevada (U.S.)

References

External links

Jepson Manual Treatment — Calochortus clavatus
Calochortus clavatus — U.C. Photo gallery

clavatus
Endemic flora of California
Flora of the Sierra Nevada (United States)
Natural history of the California chaparral and woodlands
Natural history of the California Coast Ranges
Natural history of the Central Valley (California)
Natural history of the San Francisco Bay Area
Natural history of the Santa Monica Mountains
Natural history of the Transverse Ranges
Flora without expected TNC conservation status